EuroBioBank is an organization which manages a network of biobanks in Europe. It  provides human DNA, cell, and tissue samples to the scientific community  for research on rare diseases.

Founding
Before the founding of EuroBioBank, researchers typically stored biobank specimens in their own laboratories and used them only for their own work.  EuroBioBank allows researchers in many places to all share specimens.

Members
The following are member biobanks:

EURORDIS
Généthon
Myobank – AFM, Myology Institute      	France ( Paris )
3 C-R (Conseil et expertise pour les biobanques) 	France (Castelginest)
MTCC (Muscle Tissue Culture Collection), University of Munich
DNA biobank of the Department of Molecular Genetics and Diagnostics, National Institute of Environmental Health (NIEH) Hungary
Bank of the National Laboratory for the Genetics of Israeli Populations (NLGIP), Tel-Aviv University
Bank for the Diagnosis and Research of Movement Disorders (MDB), Carlo Besta Neurological Institute
Bank of the Muscle Cell Biology Laboratory, Carlo Besta Neurological Institute
DNA cell lines and nerve-muscle-cardiac tissues bank, UOS Malattie Neuromuscolari, University of Milan
Bank for the Diagnosis and Research on Neuromuscular Disorders (NHMGB), Cardiomyology and Medical Genetics, Second University of Naples
Neuromuscular Tissue Bank (NMTB), Department of Neurosciences, University of Padua
Bank of the Molecular Genetics Laboratory, University of Malta
Neuromuscular Tissue Bank of the University of Ljubljana
Bank of the Research Institute for Rare Diseases -Carlos III Health Institute (Spain)
MRC Centre for Neuromuscular Diseases BioBank, London
MRC Centre for Neuromuscular Diseases BioBank, Newcastle
Quebec Myotonic Dystrophy Biocatalog
Genomic and Genetics Disorders Biobank (GGNB) at the Casa Sollievo della Sofferenza Hospital.

References

External links

International research institutes
Biobank organizations